Poraali is a 2011 Indian Tamil language action thriller film written and directed by Samuthirakani, starring Sasikumar in the lead role. The film also featuring Telugu actor Naresh and Swati alongside Niveda Thomas, Vasundhara, Soori and Ganja Karuppu in pivotal roles, released on 1 December 2011. Poraali illustrates an astute fighter who can take on a large, greedy group. The film was dubbed in Telugu as Sangharshana  and remade in Kannada as Yaare Koogadali.

Plot
The story begins on a rainy night when Ilangkumaran and Nallavan escape from somewhere and enter Chennai with their past actions unclear. They settle at Pulikutti's residence and find jobs in a petrol bunk. Bharathi comes into Kumaran's life. Her initial wrong belief about him changes as soon as she knows his kindheartedness. Soon, love blooms between them. Kumaran, along with his friends, starts a venture, which grows fast. This makes Pulikutti give an advertisement in a magazine with their photo. Then comes a group chasing for Kumaran and his friends. Within a few minutes, Pichai, a friend of Kumaran, arrives in Chennai and shares some news. Kumaran's old life is shown in the second half, and it is revealed that he is persuaded to be mentally ill because of his father and stepmother's desire for wealth. The film comes to an end after many interesting twists.

Cast

 Sasikumar as Ilangkumaran
 Naresh as Nallavan
 Swati as Bharathi
 Niveda Thomas as Thamizhselvi
 Vasundhara Kashyap as Maari
 Soori as Pichai
 Ganja Karuppu as Pulikutti
 Sandra Amy as Shanthi
 Jayaprakash as Doctor
 G. Gnanasambandam as House Owner
 Badava Gopi as Ground Floor Tenant
 Kalpana Shree as Ilangkumaran's stepmother
 Namo Narayana
 Gnanavel

Soundtrack

The soundtrack is scored by Sundar C Babu.

Critical reception
Poraali generally opened to positive reviews. Pavithra Srinivasan of Rediff gave the film 3 out of 5, saying that "Poraali is worth a watch". Indiaglitz stated that "Poraali provides sparkling moments that will linger in our hearts." A critic from filmics wrote that "Porali is definitely an enjoyable entertainer with a big message." Anupama Subramanian of Deccan Chronicle said "Script triumphs after the struggle"  Sify rated the film 4/5 stating that "Poraali has its heart in the right place, and Sasikumar's charismatic, alluring appeal lifts this film considerably." A critic from Top10cinema wrote that "Poraali has multiple issues running horizontally with the main plot laced in the second half." According to NDTV "Samudrakani manages to get his grip back on the narration, knotting it all up into a fairly engaging whole." Selena of Cini.in gave it 4.2 out of 5 and calling "A nice movie with a powerful message narrated with the Samudrakani flavour." Supergoodmovies gave 3/5 and said "There are many interesting things to watch out in Porali." On the contrary, Rohit Ramachandran of Nowrunning.com rated it 2/5 calling the movie "A vague experience" Behindwoods also rated it 2 star stating that "This earnest Porali needed more power." According to IBNLive "Porali lacks finesse and reason".

References

External links
 

2010s buddy films
Tamil films remade in other languages
Films directed by Samuthirakani
Indian buddy films
Indian action thriller films
Films scored by Sundar C. Babu
2010s Tamil-language films
2011 action thriller films
2011 films